Jyväskylän maalaiskunta, 'The Rural Municipality of Jyväskylä' is a former municipality of Finland. Together with Korpilahti, Jyväskylän maalaiskunta was consolidated with Jyväskylä on 1 January 2009. It was the last municipality to carry the name maalaiskunta.

Jyväskylän maalaiskunta had three population centres: Vaajakoski, Tikkakoski and Palokka. Jyväskylä Airport in Tikkakoski used to be one of the busiest in Finland. Jyväskylän maalaiskunta was the second biggest municipality without the name kaupunki (city, town) in Finland (the largest being Nurmijärvi). It was the last municipality with the name maalaiskunta.

The last municipality mayor of Jyväskylän maalaiskunta was Arto Lepistö.

Geography

Distances
Helsinki 270 km
Kuopio 140 km
Lahti 170 km
Tampere 150 km

Villages
Prior to its consolidation into Jyväskylä in 2009, Jyväskylän maalaiskunta consisted of the following villages:

 Haapaniemi, Humalamäki, Ilmoniemi, Jylhänperä, Kaunisharju, Puuppola, Kuohu, Leppälahti, Metsoniemi, Nyrölä, Oravasaari, Palokka, Perälä, Tikkakoski, Tikka-Mannila, Jyskä, Vaajakoski, Vesanka and Väinölä

History 
The original center of the area was Jyväskylä itself, first mentioned in 1565. It was a part of either the Rautalampi parish or the Jämsä parish. Administratively Jyväskylä and Palokka were parts of the Saarioinen division while Keljo was a part of the Sääksmäki division. It became a part of the Laukaa chapel community in 1593, which became a separate parish in 1627/1628. The villages that would later form Jyväskylän maalaiskunta had been permanently transferred to the Laukaa parish by 1646.

Jyväskylä acquired its first chapel in 1676 and a church in 1693. The chapel community included the villages of Jyväskylä, Palokka, Keljo, Haapaniemi, Puuppola, Tikkamannila, Nyrölä as well as four farms from Leppävesi (and a fifth farm in the 1740s) that would later become Oravasaari and Toivakka. Vehniä, despite its transfer to Laukaa together with the other villages, remained a part of Laukaa proper.

The modern town of Jyväskylä was established in 1837. It became its own parish in the 1850s, which also included the territories that would become Jyväskylän maalaiskunta in 1868. The town and the municipality shared a parish until 1880. Toivakka was transferred from Laukaa to Jyväskylän mlk in 1871, remaining a part of it until 1910.

In 1941, the areas of Halssila, Keljo, Lohikoski, Nisula, Savela, Taulumäki and Tourula were transferred from Jyväskylän mlk to Jyväskylä, while the same was done for Kuokkala, Haukkala, Keljonkangas and Taka-Keljo in 1965.

Vaajakoski and Palokka started growing in the 20th century, eventually merging into the built-up area of Jyväskylä in the 80s while still remaining parts of Jyväskylän mlk. In 2009, Jyväskylän maalaiskunta and Korpilahti were merged into the town of Jyväskylä.

Transportation 
The geographically lowest of the six locks on the Keitele-Päijänne canal is located in Vaajakoski. The European routes E63 and E75 run through Jyväskylän maalaiskunta east and north of Jyväskylä, respectively. Likewise, the east- and westbound railway lines that leave Jyväskylä have been laid on the rural municipality's soil.

Services and economy 
Business life in Jyväskylän maalaiskunta is diversified. In addition to its conventional agriculture and forestry output, the municipality is home to companies such as Komas Oy, a system supplier of mechanical subassemblies, and Tikka Group, a manufacturer of studs for car winter tires (the situation as of 2006). Historically, Vaajakoski hosted a wide range of conventional industries up until the 1980s when structural changes in Finland's economy resulted in a shutdown of many long-standing factories and mills also in Jyväskylä's rural sibling. However, still actively operating in Vaajakoski's industrial area is the Panda chocolate and sweets factory, whose products are marketed the world over.

Palokankeskus in Palokka is a significant commercial area by the national road 4.

External links

Jyväskylän maalaiskunta – Official Site

References

Notes 
1.The municipal administration was located in Taulumäki, even after it was transferred to the town of Jyväskylä in 1941.

Former municipalities of Finland
Jyvaskylan maalaiskunta
Populated places disestablished in 2009
2009 disestablishments in Finland
Jyväskylä